Lepidoceras is a genus of flowering plants belonging to the family Santalaceae.

Its native range is Peru to Chile.

Species:

Lepidoceras chilense 
Lepidoceras peruvianum

References

Santalaceae
Santalales genera